Revoredo is a surname. Notable people with the surname include:

Enrique Labo Revoredo (1939–2014), Peruvian football referee
Helena Revoredo (born 1947), Spanish businesswoman
 (1929–1999), Peruvian priest and architect
Renzo Revoredo (born 1986), Peruvian footballer